Sosnová may refer to places in the Czech Republic:

Sosnová (Česká Lípa District), a municipality and village in the Liberec Region
Sosnová (Opava District), a municipality and village in the Moravian-Silesian Region